Nanov is a commune in Teleorman County, Muntenia, Romania. It is composed of a single village, Nanov. 

The commune is situated in the middle of the Wallachian Plain, on the banks of the Nanov River. It is crossed by the 44th parallel north.

References

Communes in Teleorman County
Localities in Muntenia